The men's 100 metres at the 2011 World Championships in Athletics was held at the Daegu Stadium on August 27 and August 28. The highly favored defending champion and world record holder Usain Bolt was disqualified from the final for making a false start. Seventy four athletes started the competition, with 61 nations being represented (18 of them in the preliminaries only). It was the first global final to be held following the introduction of the no-false start rule.

The four fastest 100-metre runners of 2011 were absent: Mike Rodgers (9.85 sec) and Steve Mullings (9.80 sec) had been banned for doping offences, while Tyson Gay (9.79 sec) and 2011 world leader Asafa Powell (9.78 sec) could not compete due to injuries.

A preliminary round was introduced, where those entrants who had not obtained the 100 m qualification standard had to compete in a further qualifying stage before making it into the first round proper. This reduced the event to a three-round competition, as opposed to the traditional four, for qualified runners. Kim Kuk-Young (the host nation's sole entrant) was disqualified in this round for a false start. Abdouraim Haroun was the fastest preliminary runner, Keiron Rogers broke the Anguillian record, and while the slowest of the round was Sogelau Tuvalu, his time of 15.66 seconds was a personal best for the shot put specialist.

Usain Bolt had the fastest time of the first day (10.10) while his Jamaican compatriots won three of the other seven heats. Christophe Lemaitre, Kim Collins and Walter Dix were the other winners. In the first of the semi-finals, Yohan Blake became the first man under ten seconds. Bolt won the second race as the second-fastest qualifier (10.05) and Collins won the third to become the oldest ever 100 m finalist. Frenchman Jimmy Vicaut became only the second junior athlete ever to qualify for the 100 m final, after Darrel Brown in 2003. The most prominent eliminations were Olympic silver medallist Richard Thompson (the fastest entrant that year with 9.85 sec) and 2004 Olympic champion Justin Gatlin. Dwain Chambers (a 2009 finalist) false-started, while sub-9.9 sec runners Michael Frater and Ngonidzashe Makusha also failed to progress.

In the 100 m final defending champion Usain Bolt caused an upset by false starting – Yohan Blake had made a slight movement but Bolt was the one who left his blocks, being immediately disqualified. In his absence, it was quick starter Kim Collins who led for the first half of the race. However, Blake was strongest in the second half, taking the lead and sprinting to win the gold medal with a time of 9.92 seconds into the −1.4 m/s headwind. Walter Dix made up ground on Collins, with the American edging into the silver medal position at the line by a margin of 0.01 seconds. At  old, bronze medallist Collins became the oldest ever world medallist for the men's 100 m.

Medalists

Records
Prior to the competition, the records were as follows:

Qualification standards

Schedule

Results

Preliminary round
Qualification: First 3 in each heat (Q) and the next 1 fastest (q) advance to the heats.

Wind:Heat 1: +1.7 m/s, Heat 2: +1.2 m/s, Heat 3: -1.3 m/s, Heat 4: -0.9 m/s

Heats
Qualification: First 3 in each heat (Q) and the next 3 fastest (q) advance to the semifinals.

Wind:Heat 1: −1.7 m/s, Heat 2: −1.7 m/s, Heat 3: −1.0 m/s, Heat 4: −1.3 m/s, Heat 5: −1.2 m/s, Heat 6: −0.7 m/s, Heat 7: −1.2 m/s

Semifinals

Qualification: First 2 in each heat (Q) and the next 2 fastest (q) advance to the Final.

Wind:Heat 1: −0.4 m/s, Heat 2: −1.0 m/s, Heat 3: −0.8 m/s

Final

Wind: −1.4 m/s

References

External links
100 metres results at IAAF website

100
100 metres at the World Athletics Championships